Anolis benedikti is a species of lizard in the family Dactyloidae. The species is found in Panama and Costa Rica.

References

Anoles
Reptiles of Panama
Reptiles of Costa Rica
Reptiles described in 2011
Taxa named by Gunther Köhler
Taxa named by Sebastian Lotzkat
Taxa named by Andreas Hertz